Arthur Thomson (1927–1990) was a British artist and writer, a highly regarded member of British science fiction fandom from the 1950s onwards, both as a fanzine writer/editor and prolific artist (under the name "ATom"). Resident illustrator for the influential fanzine Hyphen, he won the TransAtlantic Fan Fund in 1964  and visited the United States (an event he wrote up for the following year's ATom Abroad ). Thomson was nominated five times for the Hugo Award for Best Fan Artist, but never won.

Nearly two decades after his death, Thomson's distinctive artwork still appears in such fanzines as the Hugo-nominated, Nova Award-winning Banana Wings. After Thomson won the 2000 Rotsler Award, it was decided not to present the Rotsler posthumously again.

References

External links
 Biography and bibliography by Rob Hansen 
 Samples of Thomson's art
 More Thomson's art

1927 births
1990 deaths
Science fiction artists
British science fiction writers
20th-century British novelists